The following lists events that happened during 1814 in Australia.

Incumbents
Monarch - George III

Governors
Governors of the Australian colonies:
Governor of New South Wales – Lachlan Macquarie
Lieutenant-Governor of Van Diemen's Land – Major Thomas Davey

Events
 31 January – The "holey dollar" and "dump" go into circulation.

Births
3 March – Louis Buvelot
Date unknown: Robert Richard Torrens

Deaths
8 May – Francis Grose
19 July – Matthew Flinders
 31 August – Admiral Arthur Phillip RN, British naval officer and former Governor of New South Wales, dies at Bath, England aged 75.

References

 
Australia
Years of the 19th century in Australia